Penion mandarinus, common name the mandarin penion, southern siphon whelk or Waite's buccinum whelk, is a species of medium-to-large predatory sea snail or whelk, a marine gastropod mollusc in the family Buccinidae, the true whelks.

Description
Penion mandarinus is a medium-to-large sized species of siphon whelk. The species could be confused with the sympatric species P. maximus, however P. mandarinus is typically smaller and has a smoother shell with a shorter siphonal canal.

Distribution
This marine species is endemic to Australia (New South Wales, South Australia, Tasmania, Victoria).

Evolution
Penion mandarinus is closely related to another Australian species P. maximus. The species have overlapping geographic ranges (sympatry) and may have evolved from a common ancestor via niche differentiation based on prey size and water depth.

Subspecies
These subspecies have been previously recognised:
 Penion mandarinus mandarinus (Duclos, P.L., 1831)
 Penion mandarinus waitei (Hedley, 1903)

References

External links
 World Register of Marine Species: Penion mandarinus (Duclos, 1832)
 Molluscs of Tasmania: Buccinidae - Siphonaliinae: Penion mandarinus (Duclos, 1831) ('mandarin whelk')
 Seashells of New South Wales: Penion mandarinus (Duclos, 1831))
 
 Natural History Museum Rotterdam - Mollusca - Gastropoda - Buccinidae

Buccinidae
Gastropods of Australia
Gastropods described in 1831